Coronidia hyphasis is a moth of the  family Sematuridae. It is known from the Neotropics, including Mexico.

References 

Sematuridae
Moths described in 1856